The Cambodia National Rescue Party (CNRP) was a major political party in Cambodia. It was founded in 2012 as a merger between the Sam Rainsy Party and Human Rights Party.

The party believed in the strengthening of freedom and human rights, institution of free and fair elections, and defending Cambodia's "national integrity". It became the sole challenger to the Cambodian People's Party after the 2013 election. Its official motto was "Rescue, Serve, Protect" and the logo for the CNRP is the rising sun.

Party leader Kem Sokha was arrested in September 2017, after which the party was in danger of being dissolved, allegedly for being part of a foreign plot to overthrow Prime Minister Hun Sen. The case was heard by the Supreme Court of Cambodia which is headed by Chief Justice Dith Munty, a member of the ruling CPP's permanent committee.

On 16 November 2017,  the Supreme Court ruled to dissolve the CNRP. Charles Santiago, Chairman of ASEAN Parliamentarians for Human Rights, called "the final nail in the coffin for Cambodian democracy". As a result of the ruling, all CNRP office holders, including 489 commune chiefs and 55 MPs, lost their positions and had their seats allocated to other parties. Additionally, 118 senior party officials were banned from politics for five years. About half the party’s former MPs, including its vice president Mu Sochua, had already fled Cambodia before October out of fear of arrest by the ruling party. The forced dissolution of the party prompted condemnation and calls to reverse the decision from the international community.

Party platform
The 7-point policies of the CNRP:
 A pension of 40,000 riels or US$10 a month for old people aged 65 and over.
 A minimum wage of 600,000 riels or US$150 a month for workers.
 A minimum wage of 1,000,000 riels or US$250 a month for public servants.
 Guarantee of prices for farm produce (the lowest price of rice is 1,000 riels or US$0.25 per kilo) and of markets for it.
 Free medical care for the poor.
 Equal opportunity of the young to receive quality education and to have employment.
 Lowering the prices of fuel, fertilizers, electricity, and interests on loans.

Policies

Domestic policy
The domestic policy of the CNRP promoted national reconciliation by banning discrimination, patronage and nepotism based on a set of principles: 
 Non-violent struggle and peaceful resolution of problems.
 Respect and observance of human rights.
 Address the issue of illegal immigration through effective enforcement of the nationality law and the immigration law.
 Social justice with the state’s guarantee of human rights, freedoms and equal opportunities in the political, economic and social life.
 Pluralistic liberal democracy where power belongs to the people. 
 Sustainable development putting emphasis on production for export, competitiveness and preservation of national resources.
 Propose a referendum for same-sex marriage.

Economy
The CNRP advocated a free market economy based on economic liberalism.
 Competition and equitable development. 
 Production for domestic products for consumption and exportation.
 Promotion of small and medium-sized enterprises and the creation of confidence for foreign investment.

Education, youth and employment

 Human resource development with equal access to education. 
 Quality and high standard education. 
 Technical and professional training to equip the youth with high skills. 
 Introducing student loans and scholarship plans for higher education.

Healthcare
 Universal health care
 Clean water, hygiene, and sanitary systems.
 Reform of the health care system by improving the expertise and ethics of medical staffing, provisions of adequate medicine, and medical equipment.

Agriculture
The CNRP called for the raising of living standards for farmers through the provision of adequate farm land and utilization of farm technology, competitiveness, improvement of the quality of farm produce, search for markets for farm produce, and fixing the interest on farm loans to one percent per month.

Women's rights
The CNRP believed in empowering all women to strengthen the foundation of Cambodian society through equal participation in all spheres of public and private life by guaranteeing opportunities to achieve women's financial security, social welfare, land, education, health, justice, and politics.

Regional strength

 Majority 
 Minority

Support base

The CNRP's support base was in the urban populated areas; in rural villages whose livelihood is affected by the land grabbing crisis, and young post-Khmer Rouge baby boomers.

List of party leaders

Organization
Executive Committee

 
1. Yim Sovann (President)
2. Mao Monyvann (Vice President)
3. Yem Ponhearith (Honorary Chairman)
4. Kuoy Bunroeun
5. Kem Monovithya 
6. Ky Wandara
7. Vann Chan

Standing Committee

 
1. Kem Sokha (President) 
2. Pol Hom (Vice President) 
3. Mu Sochua (Vice President)
4. Eng Chhai Eang (Vice President) 
5. Yim Sovann (Secretary-General)
6. Ou Chanrith
7. Yem Ponhearith
8.  Ky Wandara
9. Ho Vann
10. Mao Monyvann
11. Kuoy Bunroeun
12. Kem Monovithya

13. Vann Chan
14. Tioulong Saumura 
15. Kimsour Phirith
16. Thach Setha  
17. Son Chhay
18. Cheam Channy
19. Toun Youkda
20. Lim Bunsidaret
21. Keo Sambath
22. Ke Sovannaroth
23. Men Sothavarin

Election results

General election

Communal elections

See also
 2013–2014 Cambodian protests

References

External links
Cambodia National Rescue Party's Official Website 
Sam Rainsy Party homepage
 A web interactive documentary following the adventures of CNRP during 2013 General Elections

2012 establishments in Cambodia
Cambodian democracy movements
Liberal parties in Cambodia
Nationalist parties in Cambodia
Political parties established in 2012
Political parties disestablished in 2017
Defunct political parties in Cambodia
Populist parties
Banned political parties
2017 disestablishments in Cambodia